Leonidas Asprilla (born 31 July 1952) is a Colombian boxer. He competed in the men's lightweight event at the 1976 Summer Olympics.

References

External links
 

1952 births
Living people
Colombian male boxers
Olympic boxers of Colombia
Boxers at the 1976 Summer Olympics
Place of birth missing (living people)
Lightweight boxers